Greg Owens (born 27 January 1981) is an Australian footballer who last played a midfielder for Bankstown City Lions in the NSW Premier League. He was born in Bathurst, New South Wales.

Honours
With Central Coast Mariners:
 A-League Premiership: 2007-2008
With Adelaide United:
 A-League Premiership: 2005-2006
With Sydney Olympic:
 NSL Championship: 2001-2002

References

External links
 Central Coast Mariners profile
 Oz Football profile
 Sports Australia article

1981 births
Living people
People from Bathurst, New South Wales
Association football midfielders
Australian soccer players
Australia youth international soccer players
Australia under-20 international soccer players
Australian expatriate soccer players
Expatriate footballers in Malaysia
A-League Men players
National Soccer League (Australia) players
Adelaide United FC players
Central Coast Mariners FC players
Sydney Olympic FC players
Sydney United 58 FC players
Sportsmen from New South Wales
Soccer players from New South Wales
Bankstown City FC players